The Rosanna Shuffle is the drum pattern from the Grammy Award winning Toto hit "Rosanna". It is known as a "half-time shuffle" and shows "definite jazz influence". It features ghost notes and is derived from the combination of what Jeff Porcaro, who plays on the song's recording, calls the "Bernard Purdie half time shuffle" (Purdie shuffle) and the "John Bonham beat" (from "Fool in the Rain") with the well-known Bo Diddley beat. The pattern is notoriously difficult.

Sources

External links
 "Jeff Porcaro", Drummer World. including the actual beat with transcription.
 "Toto IV Lyrics", Official Toto website.
 "Rosanna by Toto", SongFacts.com.
 "Rosanna by Toto" from Music.Yahoo.com.

Drum patterns
Rhythm and meter
Swing music
Toto (band)